Jacoona is a genus of butterflies in the family Lycaenidae. The three species of this genus are found in the Indomalayan realm.

Species
Jacoona anasuja (C. & R. Felder, 1865)
Jacoona irmina Fruhstorfer, 1904
Jacoona fabronia  (Hewitson，[1878])

External links

 "Jacoona Distant, 1884" at Markku Savela's Lepidoptera and Some Other Life Forms

 
Lycaenidae genera
Taxa named by William Lucas Distant
Butterflies described in 1884